Hactem Tuba Özkan-Haller is a Turkish–American earth scientist who is a professor at Oregon State University. She is the Interim Dean for the College of Earth, Ocean, and Atmospheric Sciences. Her research makes use of numerical, field, lab and analytical approaches to understanding ecological processes.

Early life and education 
Özkan-Haller is the daughter of an admiral in the Turkish navy and says that she had an oceanic upbringing. She studied civil engineering at the Boğaziçi University in Istanbul. She moved to the United States for graduate studies, where she earned a master's degree and a PhD in civil engineering at the University of Delaware. Her research considered the evolution of shear instabilities in longshore currents. After earning her doctorate, she moved to the University of Michigan, where she was on the faculty for three years.

Research and career 
Özkan-Haller joined Oregon State University in 2001. Her research looks to generate a predictive understanding of the ocean. She has investigated the impact of three-dimensional "surfzone" eddy currents and their role in distributing pollutants and marine organisms. She used Acoustic Doppler current profilers to make observations of surf zone mean currents and eddies, which she combined with numerical models.

Özkan-Haller has held positions at Oregon State including Associate Vice President for Research Administration and Development and Interim Dean. She serves on the National Oceanic and Atmospheric Administration Hydrographic Survey Review Panel and the United States Army Corps of Engineers Coastal Engineering Research Board. She is part of an National Science Foundation Advance Grant that looks to improve the participation of women in earth sciences.

Awards and honors 
 Office of Naval Research Young Investigator Award

Selected publications

References 

Year of birth missing (living people)
Living people
Turkish emigrants to the United States
American women earth scientists
American earth scientists
20th-century American scientists
20th-century American women scientists
20th-century earth scientists
21st-century American scientists
21st-century American women scientists
21st-century earth scientists
Boğaziçi University alumni
University of Delaware alumni
University of Michigan faculty
Oregon State University faculty
Women deans (academic)